Narelle Oliver (1960 - 2016) was an Australian artist, print maker and award-winning children's author-illustrator.

Early life
Narelle Oliver was born on 25 February 1960 and grew up in Toowoomba in south east Queensland.

Career
Oliver majored in design and printmaking while studying for a Bachelor of Education degree. She began her career teaching at the Queensland School for the Deaf. 

Oliver was an educator and a committed environmentalist. As an illustrator, Oliver combined linocut, watercolour, pastels, collage and digitally-enhanced photographs in her work.  She used many environmental themes drawing on the flora and fauna of Australia.

Oliver's first book, Leaf Tail, was published in 1989.

Works

Honours and awards
 1996 Children's Book Council of Australia Book of the Year Award Winner for The Hunt
 1999 Royal Zoological Society of NSW Whitley Award - Best Book for Older Readers for Sand Swimmers: The Secret Life of Australia's Dead Heart
 2000 joint winner The Wilderness Society Environment Award for Children's Literature — Picture Book for Sand Swimmers: The Secret Life of Australia's Dead Heart
 2007 New South Wales Premier's Literary Awards — Patricia Wrightson Prize for Children's Books for Home
 2013 Queensland Literary Awards — Children's Book Award for Don't let a spoonbill in the kitchen

Personal life
Oliver lived in Brisbane with her husband Greg and their children Jessie and Liam. She died on 5 October 2016.

References

External links
 Professional website
 
 Instructional video

Australian children's writers
Australian children's book illustrators
Australian women writers
Australian women illustrators
1960 births
2016 deaths